Ma Zhen (born 1 June 1998) is a Chinese professional footballer who currently plays as a goalkeeper for Shanghai Shenhua.

Club career
Ma Zhen would be promoted to the senior team of top tier club Tianjin Tianhai in the 2019 Chinese Super League season to act as cover for first choice goalkeeper Zhang Lu. He would make his debut in a league game on 12 May 2019 against Guangzhou R&F F.C. where the Head coach Shen Xiangfu brought him on to replace outfield player Wu Wei and played him as an attacker for the final few minutes of the game that ended in a 2-1 defeat. The following season Ma Zhen would join another top tier club in Shanghai Shenhua for the start of the 2020 Chinese Super League campaign. He would make his debut as a goalkeeper for the club on 27 October 2020 in a league game against Chongqing Dangdai Lifan F.C. that ended in a 3-1 victory.

Career statistics
.

References

External links

1998 births
Living people
Chinese footballers
Association football goalkeepers
Chinese Super League players
Tianjin Tianhai F.C. players
Shanghai Shenhua F.C. players